The Roman Catholic Archdiocese of Agaña (Latin: Archidiœcesis Aganiensis, Spanish: Arquidiócesis de Agaña) is an ecclesiastical territory or diocese of the Catholic Church in the United States.  It comprises the United States dependency of Guam.  The prelate is an archbishop whose cathedral is the Dulce Nombre de Maria Cathedral-Basilica.

The archdiocese is a member of the Episcopal Conference of the Pacific (CEPAC) and of the Federation of Catholic Bishops' Conferences of Oceania, and an observer to the United States Conference of Catholic Bishops.

History

The first Catholic church was established on Guam on June 15, 1668 by Spanish-Filipino missionaries Diego Luis de San Vitores and Pedro Calungsod. Catholics in Guam were part of the Diocese of Cebu, the Philippines. The United States acquired Guam from Spain after the Spanish–American War of 1898. On September 17, 1902, the Apostolic Prefecture of Mariana Islands was established which included Guam.

On March 1, 1911, the Apostolic Vicariate of Guam was canonically erected. On July 4, 1946, territory was added from the suppressed Vicariate Apostolic of Marianne, Caroline, and Marshall Islands.

On October 14, 1965, the Vatican elevated the apostolic vicariate to the Diocese of Agaña, as a suffragan diocese to the Roman Catholic Archdiocese of San Francisco.

On March 8, 1984, in response to the growth of Catholicism in Guam and its vicinity, the diocese was elevated to a metropolitan see, the Archdiocese and Metropolitan Province of Agaña. The metropolitan province consists of the Archdiocese of Agaña and its suffragan Roman Catholic Dioceses of Chalan Kanoa and of Caroline Islands, and the Roman Catholic Apostolic Prefecture of the Marshall Islands.

Sex abuse scandal and bankruptcy
In 2016, for the first time in the history of the archdiocese, sexual allegations surfaced against its Ordinary (at the time Archbishop Anthony Apuron). Consequently, on June 6, 2016, Pope Francis appointed Archbishop Savio Hon Tai-Fai, S.D.B., as apostolic administrator sede plena, i.e., in charge of the pastoral and administrative governance of the local Church.

On October 31, 2016, after months of an Apostolic Administration, Pope Francis appointed Michael J. Byrnes of the Archdiocese of Detroit to become Coadjutor Archbishop of Agaña with special faculties. Those faculties included complete authority in all pastoral and administrative matters in the Archdiocese, both civilly and ecclesiastically.

On March 16, 2018, Archbishop Apuron was removed from office by a Vatican tribunal after being convicted of undisclosed charges in a canonical penal trial.  Apuron appealed the decision, which suspended the verdict. However, the verdict of the First Instance canonical penal trial was upheld by the Apostolic Tribunal of the Congregation for the Doctrine of the Faith (CDF) on February 7, 2019. A final ruling was then published by the CDF on April 4, 2019, which also upheld the conviction. The final ruling made so Apuron could not only no longer serve as Bishop, but also could no longer wear the "insignia" associated with it, such as a bishop's ring, miter and staff, or dwell in property owned by the Archdiocese of Agana.

The penalties imposed by the Apostolic Tribunal of the Congregation for the Doctrine of the Faith included the privation of office; the perpetual prohibition from dwelling, even temporarily, in the jurisdiction of the Archdiocese of Agaña; and the perpetual prohibition from using the insignia attached to the rank of Bishop.

The Congregation for the Doctrine of the Faith declared that this decision represented the definitive conclusion in the penal trial, and no further appeal is possible.

On January 15, 2019 it was announced that the Archdiocese filed for Chapter 11 bankruptcy due to the financial burden created by the overwhelming amount of sex abuse lawsuits. In August 2019, it was revealed that 223 people had filed lawsuits against 35 clergymen, teachers and Boy Scout leaders tied to the Catholic Church whom they accused of sexually abusing them while serving with the Archdiocese of Agaña. Despite the bankruptcy filing, the archdiocese had only $45 million in liabilities and had until August 15, 2019, to successfully file a motion for a settlement with the sex abuse victims. Documents obtained by the Associated Press also revealed that claims of sexual abuse in the Archdiocese of Agaña dated as early as the 1950s and as recent as 2013. The archdiocese afterwards sold its Yona property for $6.1 million to help contribute to the pending settlement. By the time of the August 15 deadline, which also accounted for sex abuse claims, was reached, the number of people suing the Archdiocese for sex abuse had expanded to more than 240, with blame also being directed at the Bishop's residence and office in Hagatna.

Both the Archdiocese and sex abuse survivors negotiated for a settlement between October 30 and 31 2019. It was agreed that there would be direct mediation during the negotiations as well.  Guam served as the location for the negotiations as well. The Boy Scouts of America, the Capuchin Franciscans, and some of the people named as defendants in the lawsuits had already started making settlements with clergy sex abuse survivors since 2018. Shortly before the negotiations started, the number of sex abuse claims also expanded to nearly 280. However, the October 2019 negotiations, which were mediated by U.S. Bankruptcy Judge for the District of Hawaii Robert J. Faris, were cut short after the survivors rejected the settlement offers and continued to pursue their lawsuits. On January 15, 2020, the Archdiocese of Agana submitted its reorganization plan, which also involved a new offer for a $21 million settlement. However, it remained to be seen if the sex abuse survivors will approve of the new settlement offer.

On April 30, 2020, attorneys ended most court litigation after the Archdiocese of Agana filed proof of claim in court to help ensure the bankruptcy agreement, which also includes the potential  sex abuse settlement, would go forward. The same day, however, it was revealed in new court documents that a new lawsuit was filed against the Archdiocese of Agana by a former altar boy who claimed that Father Louis Brouillard abused him multiple times from around 1978 to 1979 on the grounds of the Barrigada church and during Boy Scouts of America outings at Lonfit River. On March 23, 2021, US Federal District Judge Frances Tydingco-Gatewood denied Aproun's motion to temporarily halt proceedings in Guam's clergy sex abuse cases. In August 2021, court filings which were made public revealed the Aproun had testified in court to deny a former Father Duenas Memorial School student's allegations that Apuron raped and sexually abused him multiple times in the school year 1994-1995 at the then-archbishop's private residence in Agana Heights.

Ordinaries

Serra was appointed Vicar Apostolic of Bluefields, Nicaragua in 1913.
Apuron was Auxiliary Bishop (1983-1986); appointed Archbishop here.
Byrnes was Coadjutor Archbishop (2016-2019).

Education

Schools operated by the archdiocese include:
 Academy of Our Lady of Guam (Hagåtña) – Secondary school for girls
 Bishop Baumgartner Memorial School (Sinajana)
 Saint Anthony Catholic School (Tamuning)
 Santa Barbara Catholic School (Dededo)

Schools previously operated by the archdiocese include:

High schools:
 Father Dueñas Memorial School (Mangilao) – Boys
 Notre Dame High School (Talofofo) – Coed

Elementary and middle schools:
 Mount Carmel School (Agat)
 St. Francis Catholic School (Yona)
 San Vicente School (Barrigada)

Elementary schools:
 Dominican School (Yigo)

Parishes 
The Archdiocese of Agaña consists of twenty-six parishes on the island of Guam:

Northern Region
 Sånta Bernadita - Agafa Gumas, Yigo
 Sånta Barbara - Dededo 
 Saint Andrew Kim - Dededo
 Saint Anthony of Padua and Saint Victor - Tamuning
 Blessed Diego Luis de San Vitores - Tumon
 Our Lady of Lourdes - Yigo

Central I Region
 Dulce Nombre de María Cathedral-Basilica - Agaña (Hagåtña)
 San Vicente Ferrer and San Roke - Barrigada
 Nuestra Señora de la Paz y Buen Viaje - Chalan Pågo
 Sånta Teresita - Mangilao
 Nuestra Señora de las Aguas - Mongmong
 Immaculate Heart of Mary - Toto

Central II Region
 Our Lady of the Blessed Sacrament - Agaña Heights
 Niño Perdido y Sagrada Familia - Asan
 Our Lady of Purification - Maina
 San Juan Bautista - Ordot
 Saint Jude Thaddeus - Sinajaña
 Assumption of Our Lady - Piti

Southern Region
 Our Lady of Mount Carmel - Agat
 Saint Joseph - Inarajan
 San Isidro - Malojloj
 San Dimas - Merizo
 San Dionisio - Umatac
 Our Lady of Guadalupe - Santa Rita
 San Miguel - Talofofo
 San Francisco de Asis - Yona

Demographics

See also

 Catholic Church by country
 Catholic Church in the United States
 Ecclesiastical Province of Agaña
 Global organisation of the Catholic Church
 List of Roman Catholic archdioceses (by country and continent)
 List of Roman Catholic dioceses (alphabetical) (including archdioceses)
 List of Roman Catholic dioceses (structured view) (including archdioceses)
 List of the Catholic dioceses of the United States

References

External links
Roman Catholic Archdiocese of Agaña
GCatholic.org

Roman Catholic Archdiocese of Agaña
Christian organizations established in 1911
Roman Catholic dioceses and prelatures established in the 20th century
1911 establishments in Guam
Companies that filed for Chapter 11 bankruptcy in 2019